Nor-West Jets Australian Football Club are an Australian rules football club based in Sydney, Australia. The club colours are blue and white. The Jets have teams in the Third and Fifth Divisions of the Sydney AFL league.

The Jets home ground is Bensons Lane located in the north-western Sydney suburb of Richmond.

History
Premierships: 2005 and 2006 (Second Division)

External links
 

Australian rules football clubs in Sydney
Australian rules football clubs established in 2001
2001 establishments in Australia